Pothencode,  is a rapidly developing business town and a developing area of Thiruvananthapuram District in the Indian state of Kerala. Spiritual leaders Brahmasree Jagadguru Swami Sathyananda Saraswathi, Sree Rama Dasa Mission, Karunakara Guru and founder of Punnyabhumi Daily hail from the village. 

It is included in Pothencode Grama Panchayat and Kazhakkuttom Block Panchayat.

Temples
Rock cut temples are one of the main styles of Kerala architecture from the 7th to 9th centuries AD. This cave temple is found at the mid-height of the rock, facing south west. It has an oblong shrine, with rock-cut lingam, an ardhamandapa and pillared facade. There is a circular walkway inside the garbhagriha. The left wall of the ardhamondapa carries a Ganapathy figure and the right side is a local chieftain. The temple is dated to about 850 AD. The Department of Archaeology declared this temple a protected monument in 1965.

Politics
Communist Party of India (CPI)  is the ruling party. In the year 2016 Assembly election C.Divakaran got a lead of 700+ votes from this panchayat. TR Anil is the panchayat President. Pothencode Grama panchayath is under Nedumangad Assembly Constituency.

 Indian National Congress
 Communist Party of India (CPI) and Communist Party of India (Marxist)
 Bharathiya Janatha Party

Surroundings
Karoor is the nearest place where two temples, one high school, and two sports and arts clubs are situated. Mahadeva Temple Karoor, Maha Vishnu temple are the ancient temples situated here. Pradhosha Vrrath and Somavara Vratha and Ayillya are the special poojas.

Murukkumpuzha is a beautiful tourist destination surrounded by lake. The lake's water source is Perumathura sea.

Religion
Pothencode is a mixed village, accommodating Hindus, Muslims, Christians and Irreligion

Education 
 Govt Higher Secondary School Ayiroopara
 Lekshmi Vilasom High school
 St.Thomas UPS Pothencode
 St.Thomas LPS Pothencode
 Govt UPS 
 Eiswara Vilasom UPS Koithoorkonam
 Govt UPS Kalloor
 Govt LPS Kalloor
 NCSU
 Pothencode Public Library
E-pro, Academy of Engineering
 Santhigiri Vidyabhavan HSS & SSS
 Nizamia public school
 Mary Matha English Medium School
 Sabarigiri International school

Govt Offices 
 Sub Registrar Office, Pothencode

References

External links 
 Panchayath Page on Kerala.gov.in

Suburbs of Thiruvananthapuram
Villages in Thiruvananthapuram district